The Office Boys is a group of rocks at the northeast end of the Clerke Rocks, lying some 40 nautical miles (70 km) east-southeast of the southeast end of South Georgia. Clerke Rocks were discovered by Captain James Cook in 1775. The Office Boys were charted and probably named by DI personnel who made surveys in the South Georgia area in the period 1926–30.

Rock formations of Antarctica